Chlum Svaté Maří (in 1961–1990 Chlum nad Ohří) is a municipality and village in Sokolov District in the Karlovy Vary Region of the Czech Republic. It has about 300 inhabitants.

Notable people
Josef Stingl (1919–2004), German politician

References

Villages in Sokolov District